The Indonesian speckled catshark (Halaelurus maculosus) is a species of catshark in the genus Halaelurus. It is a tropical catshark found in the Pacific Ocean. It was named by W. T. White, P. R. Last, and J. D. Stevens in 2007. Catsharks in this species are occasionally caught by demersal fisheries.

References

Halaelurus
Fish described in 2007